There are a number of disused stations in the Barcelona Metro network, abandoned for various reasons. This is a comprehensive list:

Closed down

Never opened

Moved to nearby locations 
All these are still in use, but have been moved somewhere around their original location. 
 Santa Eulàlia - L1
 Espanya - L1
 Universitat - L1

See also 
 Transport in Barcelona
 List of Barcelona Metro stations

References

External links 
 Lost metro stations in Barcelona
 Blog on Barcelona's "ghost stations"
 Las Estaciones Fantasma en Barcelona (in English) on Homage to BCN

Disused Barcelona Metro stations
Disused Metro stations
Disused Metro stations
Barcelona, Disused Metro stations